William R. Allan (born 1970) is a Scottish classicist specializing in Greek epic and tragedy, particularly the plays of Euripides. He is currently McConnell Laing Fellow and Tutor in Greek and Latin Languages and Literature at University College, Oxford and Professor of Greek, Faculty of Classics, University of Oxford. He was formerly Assistant Professor of Classics at Harvard University.

Background
He was educated at Glenrothes High School in Fife, then studied at the University of Edinburgh and the University of Oxford, receiving an MA and DPhil, respectively.

Works
 The Andromache and Euripidean Tragedy (Oxford University Press, 2000; paperback edn. 2003)
 Euripides: The Children of Heracles (Aris and Phillips, 2001)
 Euripides: Medea (Duckworth, 2002)
 Helen (Cambridge University Press, 2008). commentary

References

Alumni of the University of Edinburgh
People educated at Glenrothes High School
Classical scholars of Harvard University
Scottish classical scholars
1970 births
Living people
Fellows of University College, Oxford
People from Glenrothes